Falken Tire is a brand of passenger car, light truck, and medium truck tires owned by the Japanese company Sumitomo Rubber Industries (SRI). It was launched in its native country of Japan in 1983, and was introduced to the North American market two years later and in Europe in 1988. Falken has now become a stand-alone brand that focuses on UHP (Ultra High Performance) products while utilizing professional motorsports to further develop and improve products for worldwide distribution.

Sumitomo Rubber North America, Inc., formerly known as Falken Tire Corporation, is the corporate headquarters in Rancho Cucamonga, California, with a West Coast distribution center in Ontario, California. Additional Falken Tire distribution locations include warehouses in Illinois, Florida, New Jersey, and Texas.

In June 2015, Sumitomo and Goodyear announced that they would dissolve their worldwide partnership. As part of the deal, Sumitomo bought Goodyear Dunlop Tires North America, which included a manufacturing plant in Tonawanda, near Buffalo, New York. The plant, rebranded as Sumitomo Rubber USA, began to produce Falken Tire-branded tires in January 2016.

History

Timeline 

 1983: The Falken brand is created as a high performance brand of OHTSU Rubber & Tire in Japan
 1985: Started Falken Motorsports & U.S. Distribution
 1988: Team Falken wins the Mirage Cup International series
 1988: Falken introduces the Sincera Tire
 1988: Falken Tyre Europe GmbH is founded in Offenbach am Main, Germany.
 1990: The N1 6hour Endurance Sugu 400 km GT-R R32 class winner
 1991: Falken supports the BNR32 that dominated the Super N1 Taikyu Series in Japan
 1991: Team Falken participated in the Kenya Endurance rally
 1991: Opened U.S. Headquarters in Rancho Cucamonga, U.S.
 1993: Sponsors teams for the Paris to Dakar Rally Championships
 1996: The first Ziex branded tire is launched: Ziex ZE502
 1998: Began a successful campaign with Mine's Falken BNR33 which won the 98'-00' Class 1 Series Championship
 1999: Team Falken began competing in the ADAC 24th Rennen Nurburgring
 2000: Falken Tire participates in Rally Australia 2000
 2001: AZENIS Tire line is launched with AZENIS ST115 and AZENIS RT215
 2001: Team Falken wins Super Endurance Class 1 Series Championship
 2001: Falken sponsors the Pikes Peak International Hill Climb
 2003: Falken supports the first U.S. Drift Showoff in Irwindale, Ca
 2003: Falken sponsors the drivers at the first D1 Grand Prix Pro Drift Competition in the U.S.
 2005: Falken team driver Calvin Wan takes 1st place in an Infiniti G35 at the Formula Drift sanctioned event.
 2006: A Consumer Reports Top Pick: Falken ZE912
 2007: Falken moves into corporate office in Fontana, CA
 2010: Falken wins first Formula Drift Championship, Vaughn Gittin Jr.
 2010: Falken introduces the Wildpeak A/T Tire to reinvigorate the all-performance SUV and Light Truck segments.
 2011: Falken wins another back-to-back Formula Drift Championship with Daijiro Yoshihara.
 2011: 2 ALMS GT Class wins at Mid-Ohio & Baltimore 
 2012: Team Falken takes another ALMS win at Baltimore Grand Prix
 2012: New Falken Tire headquarters located in Rancho Cucamonga, CA.
 2012: Falken / Savvy Off Road wins the King of the Hammers Every Man Challenge.
 2012: Falken drift team driver Lars Verbraeken became a Guinness World Record holder after achieving a new speed record for drifting.
 2013: Falken wins again at the King of the Hammers Every Man Challenge
 2013: Team Falken takes first place in GT at ALMS Petit Le Mans
 2015: Falken becomes the Official Tire of Major League Baseball
 2016: The Sumitomo Rubber USA factory in Tonawanda began to produce Falken Tire-branded tires.
 2016: Falken partners with the Qantas Wallabies as a sponsor.
 2017: Falken became a sponsor of English Premier League team Liverpool F.C.
 2018: Falken became a sponsor of German Basketball League team EWE Baskets.
 2018: Falken Azenis FK510 wins the Wheels Magazine Tyre Test in Australia.

Motorsports 

Falken Tire Corporation has participated in many motorsport activities, including the Tudor United Sports Car Championship IMSA, the former American Le Mans Series ALMS, British Drift Championship, Irish Drift Championship, Drift Allstars European Series with driver James Deane, Formula Drift Series Formula D, ADAC 24 Hours of Nürburgring and International Drift Series. Drivers for the IMSA GT Class were Wolf Henzler and Bryan Sellers, in which they co-piloted a Porsche 911 RSR. Sponsored drivers for the Formula Drift competition were Daijiro Yoshihara, Justin Pawlak, James Deane, Piotr Wiecek, Matt Field, and Aurimas "Odi" Bakchis. Current drivers in the British Drift Championship competition are Matt Carter, Paul Cheshire and Alan Green. Drivers sponsored in 2010 International Drift Series were Remmo Niezen, Lars Verbraeken and Lennard Wanders.

Falken has sponsored racing series such as ALMS and domestic championships like Super Taikyu series, 24 Hours Nürburgring and drifting series such as Formula D and D1 Grand Prix. Falken was previously the title sponsor of the British Drift Championship until 2010 when Maxxis Tyres became the title sponsor.

Since at least 2009, Falken Tire have also a team of spokesmodels that attend to all of the American Le Mans Series and Formula Drift motorsport events.

References

External links 

 Falken European Website
 Falken Middle East Official Website

Sumitomo Group
Companies based in Kobe
Automotive companies established in 1983
Tire manufacturers of Japan
Japanese brands